Sadie Dotson Hurst (July 27, 1857 – January 17, 1952) was an American politician who served as a member of the Nevada Assembly, the first woman elected to the Nevada Legislature.

Early life
Sadie Dotson was born in Iowa in 1857. Horton and her family relocated to Reno, Nevada in the early-1900s.

Career 
Endorsed by the Nevada State Journal, she was the first woman elected to the Nevada Legislature (R-Washoe). When the legislature met in special session on February 7, 1919 to ratify the Federal Suffrage Amendment, it was Hurst who presented the resolution. She had a further distinction of being the first woman to preside over a state Legislature during the ratification of the Federal Suffrage Amendment. At the time, she was not only Nevada's first assemblywoman but also its only one, having been picked by the Women Citizens' Club of Reno, to bring women into the legislature. She also was the member of the Nevada Legislature who presented the bill to raise the age of consent for girls from 16 to 18, a bill which passed both houses and was signed by the Governor.

Hurst lost her 1920 bid for re-election, and eventually moved to California with her sons, where they established a manufacturing plant in Escondido.

Personal life 
While still in Iowa, Hurst had two children with her husband, Horton Hurst. Hurst died in Pasadena, California in 1952.

See also 

 Jeannette Rankin

References

1857 births
1952 deaths
Republican Party members of the Nevada Assembly
Women state legislators in Nevada
People from Iowa
Politicians from Reno, Nevada